Forestal Canglon Reserve is a protected area in Darien Province, Panama. The 31,650 ha reserve includes lowland tropical forest.

See also
Protected areas of Panama

References

Protected areas of Panama